The Prague Security Studies Institute (PSSI, ; PIBS) is a non-profit, nongovernmental organization established in early 2002 to advance the building of a just, secure, democratic and free-market society in the Czech Republic and other post-communist states. PSSI’s primary mission is to build an ever-growing number of informed and security-minded policy practitioners dedicated to the development and safeguarding of democratic institutions and values in the Czech Republic and its regional neighbors.
PSSI works to identify and analyze select foreign policy and security-related concerns in transatlantic relations and other theaters of the world, propose sound, achievable policy responses and host regular roundtables and major conferences on these topics. PSSI is especially alert to the intersection of global finance/energy and national security considerations.

History

The founding of PSSI was the result of nearly five years of planning and development.
In 1997, the National Security Assessments Program (NSA) was established as an entity within the Civic Institute, one of the Czech Republic’s first non-profit policy groups following the Velvet Revolution. The initial focus of the NSA Program was to enrich the national and regional debates with respect to the security-related dimensions of post-communist governance.
Over a two-year period, the NSA Program made substantial progress in informing and influencing the largely underdeveloped national security policy agenda of the Czech Republic.

The NSA Program, headed by Roger W. Robinson Jr. and Petr Vančura, convened three annual conferences, each with over 200 participants. The first conference, “NATO and Central European Security in the 21st Century” held in April 1999, was held on the fiftieth anniversary of NATO. The second conference, “A Tenth Anniversary Assessment of Central European Freedoms” in April 2000, was held to commemorate this historical development. The third, “Trans-Atlantic Missile Defense and Security Cooperation,” took place in April 2001.

Speakers from roughly eight Western and Central European countries and the US attended each of these annual conferences. The distinguished speakers included former CIA Director, James Woolsey; former US National Security Advisor, Richard Allen; US Ambassador to the Czech Republic, John Shattuck; former US Assistant Secretary of Defense, Richard Perle; prominent Soviet dissident, Vladimir Bukovsky; former Advisor to the Prime Minister of Poland, Piotr Naimsky; Air Marshal and former Chief of British Defence Intelligence, Sir John Walker; Professor of International Security Studies at the Fletcher School of Law and Diplomacy at Tufts University, Dr. Robert Pfaltzgraff Jr.; German Ambassador Hagen Graf Lambsdorff; Sorbonne Prof. Francoise Thom; Director of the Institute for Strategic Studies in Bonn, Dr. Holger Mey; William F. Martin, former Deputy Secretary of the US Department of Energy.

In 2000, the NSA Program was spun off from the Civic Institute to create The Bell Association for Freedom and Democracy. In the succeeding two years, the concept of a national security-oriented training program for future policy practitioners evolved and led to the founding of the Prague Security Studies Institute (PSSI) in early 2002. PSSI was led by former Czech National Security advisor and Director of the Foreign Intelligence Service, Oldřich Černý and Roger W. Robinson Jr., who also served as Co-Founders of the Institute.

Programs

PSSI conducts a range of activities under its Security Scholars Program, Program of Atlantic Security Studies, Regional Outreach Program and Corporate Council Program.

Regional Outreach Program
PSSI’s Regional Outreach Programs seeks to contribute to democratic institution-building in post-communist countries and to share know-how, technical expertise and professional experiences gained during the transition to democracy in the Czech Republic. The gatherings primarily involve graduate students and young professionals from those states still operating under largely authoritarian regimes ( e.g., Belarus, Russia, China, etc.) as well as young American journalists interested in this historical period and transformational process. The Outreach Program provides training with respect to the construction of a free, democratic society with a focus on reforming the security sector via the Security Reform Among other countries, the Program works closely with students and early career professionals from Ukraine, Moldova and Kosovo and organizes a series of meetings with, and briefings by, current and former Czech security policy experts and practitioners from the Parliament.

Security Scholars Programs 
Robinson-Martin Security Scholars Program ( RMSSP)
PSSI’s flagship program, launched in early 2002, is a two-semester, advanced introductory course to Security Studies held on the premises of PSSI for highly qualified Czech University students. The program offers lectures by, and interaction with, some 20 foreign policy luminaries from around the world in small group settings. As is stated on PSSI’s webpage, the overarching goal is building an ever-growing number of young, visionary professionals across the post-communist space well-versed in key security-related subjects and challenges.

MA Degree Program in Security Studies
PSSI co-sponsors Charles University’s master's degree Program in Security Studies to help enrich and accelerate the theoretical and practical training of security policy professionals and provide them with detailed knowledge concerning a number of prominent global “flashpoints.” and issue areas such as terrorism and WMD proliferation, energy security, counterspace defense, festering regional conflicts, the eurozone crisis, Putin’s Russia, China’s rise, financial sanctions etc. The MA Degree Program offers courses well beyond regional and transatlantic security concerns, covering the Middle East, East Asia and other theaters and focusing on disciplines, such as international economics and finance, intelligence gathering and dissemination and global energy security. In the Fall of 2012, an English-language curriculum was introduced, greatly expanding access to this cutting-edge program.

Whitaker Chair and Lecture Series in Security Studies
Named in honor of one of PSSI´s principal benefactors, Dr. James Q. Whitaker, this high-level Lecture Series focuses on free-market economics and geopolitical benefits, policy prescriptions important to Central and Eastern Europe as well as on priority security challenges worldwide.

Summer School
Since 2005, PSSI, in cooperation with NATO’s Public Diplomacy Division, has offered an intensive course of study in July each year for graduate students in political science, international relations and other relevant fields from NATO’s member states and partner countries. The Summer School often has as many as 15 nationalities represented in each these sessions. Subjects include key future challenges for NATO as well as pressing issues on the global security agenda, such as the trajectory of Russia, transatlantic relations, Afghanistan, energy security and the new NATO’s Strategic Concept.

Program of Atlantic Security Studies
Established in 2003 to augment PSSI’s Security Scholars Program, the Program of Atlantic Security Studies serves as the Institute’s public policy arm. It seeks to identify and analyze relevant foreign policy and security-related issues that affect the transatlantic community as well as international security more broadly. The primary focus of PASS is to organize international conferences, roundtables, and workshops that bring together high-level decision-makers, opinion leaders, and experts in a number of fields from different countries and disciplines that would, in many cases, not be exposed to one another under normal professional circumstances. PASS conferences have covered topics such as the NATO Strategic Concept, Asia-Pacific Security Challenges, Trilateral Space Security, and Democracy and Security.

Corporate Council Program (CCP)
The Corporate Council Program was established in the fall of 2003, Chaired by William F. Martin. The Program offers PSSI students the benefits of integrating into their academic course load the management and decision-making skills of leading business executives from across the globe. The CCP seeks to construct mutually-reinforcing relationships between select multinational corporations/banks and PSSI.  Under its banner, is our The Club of Prague, which seeks to provide a forum for a sophisticated dialogue among the region’s leading energy experts and the exploration of cooperative ventures.

PSSI Boards

International Advisory Board:

Elie Wiesel, Dennis C. Blair, R. James Woolsey, Alexandr Vondra, Timothy Garton Ash, Michael Žantovský, Michael Novak, Adam Michnik, Robert Pfaltzgraff, Dorothy Stapleton, Hassan bin Talal, Karel Schwarzenberg, Jiří Schneider, Petr Kolář; (In memoriam, Václav Havel)

Executive Committee:

R. Daniel McMichael, James Q. Whitaker, Curtin Winsor Jr., Jan Ruml, Brian Kennedy, Alejandro Chafuen, C. Richard D’Amato, Jonna Bianco.

Annual Report
PSSI Annual Report

References

External links
PSSI Official Website
Neocon Europe Prague Security Studies Institute
PSSI Washington
PSSI Twitter
PSSI Blog

2002 establishments in the Czech Republic
Think tanks established in 2002
Think tanks based in the Czech Republic
Organizations based in Prague
Security studies
Political and economic think tanks based in Europe